Alexander Hughes (died August 1977) was a footballer.

Alexander Hughes may also refer to:

Judge Dread (Alexander Minto Hughes, 1945–1998), English reggae and ska musician
Alexander Hughes (MP), Member of Parliament (MP) for Wareham in 1554
Alex Hughes (cartoonist) (born 1971), English freelance cartoonist, caricaturist and illustrator
Alex Hughes (cricketer) (born 1991), English cricketer
Alex Hughes (priest) (born 1975), Church of England priest and Archdeacon of Cambridge

See also 
 Hughes (surname)